is a sporting complex in Sendagaya, Shibuya, Tokyo, Japan. Built in 1954 for the World Wrestling Championship, it was also used as the venue for gymnastics at the 1964 Summer Olympics, and hosted the table tennis competition at the 2020 Summer Olympics.  The gymnasium was rebuilt to a futuristic design created by Pritzker Prize winner Fumihiko Maki from 1986 to 1990.

The gymnasium is a one-minute walk from Sendagaya Station on the Chūō-Sōbu Line and Kokuritsu Kyogijo Station on the Toei Oedo Line.

Description and events
The main arena includes a large indoor arena that hosts national and international sporting events. The arena holds 10,000 people (6,000 fixed, 4,000 temporary). An incomplete list of events held in the arena include:

Tokyo Indoor men's tennis
WTA Toray Pan Pacific Tennis Championships were held every February here, but from 2008 it has been held in the Ariake Coliseum;
Japan Table Tennis Championships;
The first two international hosted regular season NBA games between the Phoenix Suns and Utah Jazz on November 2 & 3, 1990.;
V.League;
Suntory Cup All Japan School Volleyball Rally;
Aeon Cup World Rhythmic Gymnastics Club Championships;
World Full Contact Karate Open Championships; as the Shinkyokushinkai Karate World Open Tournament -held every four years-;
Miki Prune Super College Volleyball.
2007 World Figure Skating Championships
Final Four of the official 2010 Women's Volleyball World Championship
2011 World Artistic Gymnastics Championships
2017 TWICE Japan Debut Showcase "Touchdown in Japan"
2019 ITTF Team World Cup
2021 Olympic Summer Games, Table Tennis

Since 2000, the arena has also been used as a concert venue. The first artist to perform there was the Japanese group Porno Graffitti.

The sub-arena houses an olympic size (50mX20m, eight lanes) swimming pool with seating for 900 people. The Japan Waterpolo Championships is held here. There is also a 25m pool (25mX13m, 6 lanes), an outdoor oval running track; a weight training room, and conference rooms.

Since April 1, 2006, the Tokyo Lifelong Learning and Culture Foundation (東京都生涯学習文化財団), along with Suntory (サントリー株式会社), Tipness (株式会社ティップネス) and O-ence (株式会社オーエンス), manage the gymnasium.

On April 25 and 26, 2015, American singer-songwriter Katy Perry brought The Prismatic World Tour to the venue with two shows.

Fees
From June 1, 2006, the fees for use of the facilities will be:
training gym/2 hours: 450 yen
pool/2 hours 600 yen:
pool (junior high school students and younger)/2 hours: 260 yen
training gym and pool/2 hours: 1000 yen
training gym, pool and dance studio/1 day: 2500 yen
one month pass: 7800 yen

See also
 List of tennis stadiums by capacity

References

External links

1964 Summer Olympics official report. Volume 1. Part 1. pp. 120–1.
Official Site
Satellite photo of the gymnasium from Google Maps
 Tokyo Metropolitan Gymnasium at Archiplanet

Sports venues in Tokyo
Indoor arenas in Japan
Tennis venues in Japan
Basketball venues in Japan
Buildings and structures in Shibuya
Badminton venues
Volleyball venues in Japan
Boxing venues in Japan
Venues of the 1964 Summer Olympics
Venues of the 2020 Summer Olympics
Olympic gymnastics venues
Olympic table tennis venues
Venues of the 1958 Asian Games
Asian Games basketball venues
Modernist architecture in Japan
Fumihiko Maki buildings
1954 establishments in Japan
Judo venues
Sports venues completed in 1954